The Arkansas Confederate Soldiers Monument, also known as Defense of the Flag, is located on the east side of the Arkansas State Capitol grounds in Little Rock, just off 4th Street.  It is a five-tiered marble structure, topped by a bronze statue of an angel standing on a sphere, and a bronze Confederate Army soldier on the front of its fourth tier.  It was built in 1904–05, with funding from a variety of sources, including the state, primarily through the efforts of a consortium of Confederate memorial groups.  Originally located prominently near the main eastern entrance to the capitol building, it was later moved to its present location on the northeast lawn.

The monument was listed on the National Register of Historic Places in 1996.

See also

National Register of Historic Places listings in Little Rock, Arkansas
List of Confederate monuments and memorials

References

1905 sculptures
Sculptures of angels
Confederate States of America monuments and memorials in Arkansas
Monuments and memorials in Little Rock, Arkansas
Monuments and memorials on the National Register of Historic Places in Arkansas
National Register of Historic Places in Little Rock, Arkansas
Neoclassical architecture in Arkansas
Statues in Arkansas
Tourist attractions in Little Rock, Arkansas
1905 establishments in Arkansas